Jatra Bhagat (1888–1916) was an Indian tribal freedom fighter and social reformist. He was the founder of Tana Bhagat Movement among the Oraon tribe.

Tana Bhagat alias Jatra Oraon was born in September 1888 at Chingari Navatoli village in Gumla district of Jharkhand. His father's name was Kodal Oraon and mother's name was Libri.

See also 
 Tana Bhagat Movement
 Tana Bhagats
 Kurukh people

References

Indian independence activists from Jharkhand
History of Jharkhand
1888 births
1916 deaths
Indian rebels
Adivasi
Scheduled Tribes of India
Indian animists